"See You at the Lights" is the third single released from the Cookies album by the Scottish indie rock band 1990s.

The track 'Super Legal' features co-vocals by Lovefoxxx and is allegedly about an incident in which the band were 'properly kidnapped' by a group of girls at All Tomorrow's Parties and taken to their chalet for twelve hours and made to sing.

Track listings
CD
 "See You at the Lights"
 "Super Legal" (Feat Lovefoxxx)
 "Diabo" (Feat Nereu)

7"
A. "See You at the Lights" 
B. "Hayley Mills"

References

2007 singles
1990s (band) songs
2007 songs